Tania Corrigan (born 1965 in Auckland, New Zealand) is a shooting competitor for New Zealand.

At the 1998 Commonwealth Games she won two silver medals partnering Jocelyn Lees; one in the 10 metre air pistol (pairs) and one in the 25 metre pistol (pairs) event. She also won a bronze medal in the 10 metre air pistol event. She secured another bronze medal at the  2002 Commonwealth Games in the 25 metre pistol (pairs) event again alongside Jocelyn Lees.

References

Living people
1965 births
New Zealand female sport shooters
ISSF rifle shooters
Olympic shooters of New Zealand
Shooters at the 2000 Summer Olympics
Commonwealth Games silver medallists for New Zealand
Commonwealth Games bronze medallists for New Zealand
Shooters at the 1998 Commonwealth Games
Shooters at the 2002 Commonwealth Games
Commonwealth Games medallists in shooting
20th-century New Zealand women
21st-century New Zealand women
Medallists at the 1998 Commonwealth Games
Medallists at the 2002 Commonwealth Games